Matlatzinca is a name used to refer to different indigenous ethnic groups in the Toluca Valley in the state of México, located in the central highlands of Mexico. The term is applied to the ethnic group inhabiting the valley of Toluca and to their language, Matlatzinca.
 
When used as an ethnonym, Matlatzinca refers to the people of Matlatzinco. Matlatzinco was the Aztec (Nahuatl) term for the Toluca Valley. The political capital of the valley was also referred to as “Matlatzinco”; this was a large city whose ruins are today known as the archaeological site of Calixtlahuaca. In Prehispanic times the Toluca Valley was the home to speakers of at least four languages: Otomi, Matlatzinca, Mazahua, and Nahuatl. Thus speakers of any of these languages could be called “Matlatzinca” if they resided in the Toluca Valley. When the Aztec native historical sources or the Spanish chroniclers refer to “the Matlatzinca” it is often not clear where they mean speakers of the Matlatzinca language, the peoples of the Toluca Valley, or even the inhabitants of Calixtlahuaca.

Language

The Matlatzinca language is part of the Oto-Pamean subgroup of the Oto-Manguean language family, which also includes Otomi, Mazahua, Pame and Chichimeca Jonaz. Linguistically the term “Matlatzinca” refers to speakers of the Matlatzinca language. In ancient, historical and modern times, the Matlatzinca language was spoken in the Toluca Valley of central Mexico, west of the Valley of Mexico. The Matlatzinca language has two subgroups or dialects that are mutually unintelligible: one called Ocuiltec or Tlahuica and Matlatzinca proper. While originally one language they are now so removed that they are often considered separate languages. Matlatzinca is severely endangered and now only spoken by around 100, mostly elderly people in San Francisco Oxtotilpa and Ocuiltec/Tlahuica spoken by between 50-100 in Ocuilan municipio in the villages San Juan Atzingo and Santa Lucía del Progreso.

References
Cazés, Daniel (1965) El pueblo matlatzinca de San Francisco Oxtotilpan y su lengua.
García Castro, René (1999) Indios, territorio y poder en la provincia matlatzinca: la negociación del espacio político de los pueblos otomianos, siglos XV-XII. CIESAS, Instituto Nacional de Antropología e Historia, and El Colegio Mexiquense, Mexico City and Toluca.
García Castro, René (2000) Los grupos indígenas del valle de Toluca. Arqueología Mexicana 8(43):50-55.
García Payón, José (1974) La zona arqueológica de Tecaxic-Calixtlahuaca y los matlatzincas: etnología y arqueología (primera parte), edición facsimilar de la de 1936, preparada por Mario Colín. Biblioteca Enciclopédica del Estado de México vol. 29. Estado de México, Toluca.
Quezada Ramírez, María Noemí (1972) Las matlatzincas: época prehispánica y época colonial hasta 1650. Serie Investigaciones vol. 22. Instituto Nacional de Antropología e Historia, Mexico City.
Sugiura Yamamoto, Yoko, Patricia Martel and Sandra Figueroa (1997) Atlas Etnográfico de la Cuenca Alta del Río Lerma: Otomíes, Mazahuas, Matlatzincas y Nahuas en los 32 municipios. Gobierno del Estado de México, Toluca.

Matlatzinca